William Gene Knuckles (April 25, 1928 – June 4, 2016) was an American football and basketball coach. He served as head football coach at McPherson College in McPherson, Kansas from the 1969 to 1970 and at Rocky Mountain College in Billings, Montana from 1974 to 1975. Knuckles was also the head basketball coach at Whitworth College—now known as Whitworth University—in Spokane, Washington from 1957 to 1960, tallying a mark of 24–57. He was hired in 1977 as athletic director and basketball coach at Northwest Christian High School in Spokane.

Head coaching record

College football

References

External links
 

1928 births
2016 deaths
Basketball coaches from Iowa
Idaho Vandals football coaches
Louisville Cardinals football coaches
McPherson Bulldogs football coaches
Rocky Mountain Battlin' Bears football coaches
Southern Illinois Salukis football coaches
Whitworth Pirates football coaches
Whitworth Pirates men's basketball coaches
High school basketball coaches in Colorado
High school football coaches in Colorado
High school basketball coaches in Washington (state)
University of Denver alumni
University of Northern Colorado alumni
Sportspeople from Sioux City, Iowa